Macanudo is an album by the American jazz pianist Ahmad Jamal of performances by Jamal with an orchestra conducted by Richard Evans. It was recorded in 1962 and released on the Argo label.

Critical reception

AllMusic awarded the album 2 stars.

A reviewer for Billboard wrote: "The album is a solid pop item, a fine thing for change of pace programming... It's very lyric in content and full of gentle and verveful melody with rhythm."

Simon Sweetman, writing for Off the Tracks, called the albumn "wonderful," and praised "the way [Jamal's] lines just coast so easily, effortlessly across the rhythm of each piece." He concluded: "A class act, of course. And something a little different within his vast, impeccable canon of music."

A writer for Ambient Exotica described the album as "something truly special" and "a gem," and commented: "Macanudo... has it all: Latin duskiness, a string-fueled magnificence, brass-infused heterodynes as well as true-to-form Jazz flavors... The album just feels great."

Track listing
All compositions by Richard Evans
 "Montevideo" – 2:57 
 "Bogota" – 4:00 
 "Sugar Loaf at Twilight" – 3:14 
 "Haitian Marketplace" – 2:57 
 "Buenos Aires" – 3:59 
 "Bossa Nova Do Marilla" – 2:56 
 "Carnival in Panama" – 3:29 
 "Belo Horizonte" – 2:32

Personnel
Ahmad Jamal – piano - except track 3, celesta
Art Davis – double bass
Orchestra conducted by Richard Evans

References 

Argo Records albums
Ahmad Jamal albums
1963 albums
Albums recorded at Van Gelder Studio